Karoline Linnert (born 30 August 1958) is a German politician of the Alliance '90/The Greens. From 2007 until 2019, she served as Senator of Finance and Mayor of the city-state of Bremen. During her time in office, she was one of two people holding the title Mayor, the other being Carsten Sieling, the President of the Senate of Bremen.

Early life and education
Linnert studied psychology at the University of Bielefeld and the University of Oldenburg, graduating in 1988.

Political career
Linnert became a member of The Greens in 1980, and was the top candidate of her party in Bremen in the 2007 state elections. From 1991, she served as a member of the Parliament of Bremen, and was chair of the Green parliamentary group from 2000 to 2007. She served as chair of the Public Expenditures Committee from 2003 to 2007.

As a result of the 2007 elections, Linnert's party entered a coalition government with the Social Democrats, and she became Senator of Finance and Mayor (co-mayor). As one of the state's representatives at the Bundesrat, she serves on the Finance Committee.

During her time in office, Linnert led the negotiations with NordLB on the takeover of state-controlled Bremer Landesbank (BLB).

Other activities

Regulatory agencies
 Stability Council, Ex-Officio Member (2010-2019)

Corporate boards
 Bremer Landesbank, Ex-Officio Chairwoman of the Supervisory Board (2007-2019)
 Bremeninvest / WFB Wirtschaftsförderung Bremen GmbH, Ex-Officio Deputy Chairwoman of the Supervisory Board (2007-2019)
 BLG Logistics Group, Ex-Officio Member of the Supervisory Board (2007-2019)
 Eurogate, Ex-Officio Member of the Supervisory Board (2007-2019)
 Öffentliche Versicherungen Bremen (ÖVB), Ex-Officio Member of the Supervisory Board (2007-2019)
 KfW, Member of the Board of Supervisory Directors (2010–2012)

References 

Alliance 90/The Greens politicians
1958 births
Living people
Mayors of Bremen
Members of the Bürgerschaft of Bremen
Politicians from Bielefeld
Women members of State Parliaments in Germany
21st-century German women politicians
Women Ministers-President in Germany